Leonid Ivanovich Filimonov (22 July 1935 – 8 February 2022) was a Russian politician.

A member of the Communist Party, he served as Minister of Oil and Gas from 1989 to 1991. He also served in the Federation Council from 1994 to 1996 and in the Legislative Duma of Tomsk Oblast from 1997 to 2001. He died on 8 February 2022, at the age of 86.

References

1935 births
2022 deaths
Soviet politicians
Russian politicians
Communist Party of the Soviet Union members
Members of the Federation Council of Russia (1994–1996)
Recipients of the Order of Honour (Russia)
Recipients of the Order of the Red Banner of Labour
Recipients of the USSR State Prize
People from Tomsk Oblast